Back Creek is a  long 4th order tributary to the Haw River, in Alamance County, North Carolina.

Variant names
According to the Geographic Names Information System, it has also been known historically as:  
Buffalo Creek

Course
Back Creek rises in a pond about 0.5 miles northeast of Carr in Orange County, North Carolina and then flows southwest to the Haw River about 1.5 miles southeast of Graham, North Carolina.

Watershed
Back Creek drains  of area, receives about 46.3 in/year of precipitation, and has a wetness index of 430.93 and is about 44% forested.

See also
List of rivers of North Carolina

References

Rivers of North Carolina
Rivers of Alamance County, North Carolina